Cargan railway station served the local mines and the village of Cargan and was on the Ballymena, Cushendall and Red Bay Railway which ran from Ballymena to Retreat in County Antrim, Northern Ireland.

History

The station was opened by the Belfast and Northern Counties Railway on 1 July 1889, which had taken ownership in October 1884.

The station connected to the local ironstone and bauxite mines via the Crommelin Mineral Tramway. The ore was then transported by rail to Ballymena and thence to Larne for shipment.

The station closed to passengers on 1 October 1930.

References 

 
 
 

Disused railway stations in County Antrim
Railway stations opened in 1889
Railway stations closed in 1930
Railway stations in Northern Ireland opened in the 19th century